Hemiphlebia mirabilis, commonly known as the ancient greenling, is a species of damselfly, the only living species of the genus Hemiphlebia and the family Hemiphlebiidae.
It is very small with a long, metallic-green body and clear wings. It is endemic to south-eastern Australia. Its natural swamp habitat is threatened by habitat loss. The oldest representatives of the family date to the Late Jurassic.

Distribution and habitat
The ancient greenling has been recorded from a small number of scattered sites, including on King Island and in Mount William, Tasmania; in Wilsons Promontory National Park and near Yea, Victoria; and in Piccaninnie Ponds Conservation Park in south-eastern South Australia.   Its recorded habitat includes permanent freshwater ponds, riverine lagoons and swamps that may dry out seasonally. A favoured site discovered in 2008, Long Swamp in the Discovery Bay Coastal Park of south-western Victoria, contains extensive areas of twig-rush (Baumea sp.) which is seasonally flooded but dries out by late summer

Conservation
The greenling's conservation status was raised from Vulnerable to Endangered in 2008 because of the limited area of habitat occupied, as well as the small and scattered character of the populations, at least some of which were in decline.

Gallery

References

Odonata of Australia
Insects of Australia
Endangered fauna of Australia
Endemic fauna of Australia
Taxa named by Edmond de Sélys Longchamps
Insects described in 1869
Damselflies
Lestoidea
Taxonomy articles created by Polbot